Mortenson Lake National Wildlife Refuge is located in southern Albany County in the U.S. state of Wyoming and includes 1,776 acres (7.2 km2). The refuge is managed by the U.S. Fish and Wildlife Service an agency within the U.S. Department of the Interior. Mortensen Lake NWR is a high altitude refuge and has several small alpine lakes of which Mortenson Lake is the largest. At 7,256 feet (2,211 m) above sea level, the refuge provides protection for numerous migratory bird species.

In 1984, the Wyoming Toad was listed as an endangered species and was widely believed to be extinct in the wild. A small population of the toad was rediscovered in 1987 in the area surrounding Mortenson Lake which led to the establishment of the refuge in 1993. Since 1995, offspring from captured examples of this extremely rare amphibian have been released into the wild to help stabilize the remaining population. The refuge is closed to all public access to aid in recovery efforts of this endangered species.

Mortenson NWR is administered by Arapaho National Wildlife Refuge in Colorado.

References

External links
 

Protected areas of Albany County, Wyoming
National Wildlife Refuges in Wyoming
Protected areas established in 1993
1993 establishments in Wyoming